Apricoxib is an experimental anticancer drug and nonsteroidal anti-inflammatory drug (NSAID). It is a COX-2 inhibitor which is intended to improve standard therapy response in molecularly-defined models of pancreatic cancer. It was also studied in clinical trials for non-small-cell lung cancer.  Development was abandoned in 2015 due to poor clinical trial results.

See also 
Tilmacoxib
Cimicoxib
NS-398
Celecoxib

References 

COX-2 inhibitors
Sulfonamides
Abandoned drugs